The Bene Tleilax, also called Tleilaxu , are an extremely xenophobic and isolationist society in Frank Herbert's science fiction Dune universe. Genetic manipulators who traffic in biological products such as artificial eyes, gholas, and "twisted" Mentats, the Tleilaxu are a major power in the Imperium. The race is ruled by a small council of Tleilaxu Masters, whose genetically engineered Face Dancer servants have the ability to mimic any human. The Masters themselves possess a bland and diminutive appearance intended to cause other races to underestimate them. In Heretics of Dune (1984) it is revealed that they are a secret totalitarian theocracy ultimately seeking domination of the known universe. Despite their influence, the Bene Tleilax are universally distrusted and inspire disgust because their products, though desirable, push the moral limits of what humanity at large considers acceptable, and can involve extensive physiological and physical manipulation of human life.

Plotlines

The original series
The Tleilaxu control a number of planets but are originally connected with Tleilax, the sole planet of the star Thalim; Herbert's 1965 novel Dune notes that the Tleilaxu are the source of "twisted" Mentats. Baron Harkonnen states his intent to "send at once to Tleilax for a new Mentat" after Piter De Vries is killed.

The Tleilaxu themselves step into the foreground in 1969's Dune Messiah, as their Face Dancer Scytale enters into a conspiracy with the Bene Gesserit, Spacing Guild, and House Corrino to topple the rule of Paul Atreides. To this end, the Tleilaxu resurrect Paul's dead friend Duncan Idaho as the ghola Hayt, trained as a Mentat. Hayt's function is to unwittingly destroy Paul psychologically, and failing that, kill Paul when triggered by an implanted command. The emotional stress of this assassination attempt unlocks Duncan's memories in Hayt, which Scytale uses to illustrate that the Tleilaxu can provide Paul with a fully realized ghola of his deceased concubine Chani, in exchange for his abdication. Paul refuses, and kills Scytale. Duncan further ponders the Tleilaxu legacy of his creation in Children of Dune (1976).

Over 3,500 years later in God Emperor of Dune (1981), Tleilaxu Face Dancers kill and replace nearly everyone in the Ixian embassy on Arrakis as part of an assassination attempt on Paul's seemingly immortal son, the God Emperor Leto II Atreides. The Tleilaxu have been providing Leto with Duncan Idaho gholas for centuries, and their plot fails in part due to the ingenuity of the latest Duncan. Leto, however, later allows himself to be assassinated in a scheme executed by Siona and an enlightened Duncan.

Another 1,500 years later in Heretics of Dune (1984), the Tleilaxu routinely provide the Bene Gesserit with Duncan Idaho gholas, and have also developed the ability to grow the spice melange in the same axlotl tanks they use to grow gholas. Secretly a theistic Zensunni society, the Tleilaxu believe they are on the brink of taking control of the Imperium. They have perfected their Face Dancers, who are now perfect mimics, able to copy the memories and consciousness of the people they imitate. Virtually undetectable to all but the Bene Gesserit, these Face Dancers begin to replace leaders in the Imperium as a means for the Tleilaxu to seize control. The plan fails as, over time, the Face Dancers come to believe they are the people they have copied, and elude their genetically-programmed loyalty to the Tleilaxu Masters.

Following the death of Leto II, humanity had been thrown into chaos. The breakdown of Leto's empire, severe famine on many worlds, and the introduction of Ixian navigation machines had caused billions of people to leave the settled worlds, striking off into unknown space in a diaspora known as The Scattering. The people who had gone out into The Scattering are often referred to as the "Lost Ones". In Heretics of Dune, the descendants and "creations" of these Lost Ones have begun to return to the Old Empire, including the fierce, domination-hungry Honored Matres and a new breed of Tleilaxu. Tleilaxu Master Tylwyth Waff notes:

By the events of Chapterhouse: Dune (1985), the Bene Tleilax have been all but eradicated by the Honored Matres save for one Master, Scytale; he is a ghola of the original Scytale of Dune Messiah, somehow having ascended from Face Dancer to Master. He tells the Bene Gesserit leader Darwi Odrade that "Descendants of people we sent into the Scattering returned with captive Futars. A mingling of human and cat, as you doubtless know. But they did not reproduce in our tanks. And before we could determine why, the ones brought to us died." Both Odrade and Scytale realize this was a ploy of the descendant Tleilaxu to gain the confidence of the Masters and yet not divulge their secrets. Scytale's secret bargaining tool while held against his will by the Bene Gesserit is a hidden nullentropy capsule containing cells carefully and secretly collected by the Tleilaxu for millennia, including the cells of Tleilaxu Masters, Face Dancers, Paul Atreides, Chani, Gurney Halleck, Thufir Hawat and other legendary figures. He intends to not only grow his own life-sustaining ghola, but to resurrect the rest of his order as well. In the meantime, he has given the Bene Gesserit enough of the axlotl technology to grow their own gholas, in particular a replacement for their military genius Miles Teg.

Sequels
In Brian Herbert and Kevin J. Anderson's 2006 continuation of the original series, Hunters of Dune, the descendant Tleilaxu, now called the Lost Tleilaxu, are at odds with their forebears. Ruled by a council of Elders, the Lost Tleilaxu have at their disposal a subgroup of advanced Face Dancers who cannot be detected by even the Bene Gesserit. The highest-level Face Dancer is Khrone, who is trusted to execute the most important tasks of the Elders. To further their goals for domination of the universe, the Lost Tleilaxu ally with the Honored Matres to obliterate nearly all Tleilaxu planets. Despite having the technology to create gholas, the Lost Tleilaxu do not know how to manufacture melange in axlotl tanks (as the "original" Tleilaxu do) because that process was developed after their line of Tleilaxu departed the Old Empire. Their immediate goal is to rediscover this secret to break the Bene Gesserit monopoly on the all-important spice.

All of the "original" Tleilaxu Masters, except for Scytale, have been killed by the Honored Matres. The Lost Tleilaxu leadership has also been infiltrated and overtaken by Khrone's Face Dancers; with it no longer necessary to pretend to be inferior to the Elders, Khrone kills the last true Elder, Burah. The Face Dancers have also secretly gained control of many similar power bases across the Old Empire. Under the leadership of Khrone, the Lost Tleilaxu's new primary goal is to find the Ithaca, the no-ship that escaped Chapterhouse. A minion of Daniel and Marty, Khrone believes their "infallible" projections that the Ithaca contains something or someone important to them, the necessary fulcrum to influence the final battle against the human race. Meanwhile, Scytale, still a prisoner of the Bene Gesserit on the wandering Ithaca, manages to negotiate permission to grow a ghola of himself.

Second-rank Lost Tleilaxu Uxtal had served Elder Burah, transcribing meetings and disseminating the information to other Elders. After Burah's murder, Khrone sends Uxtal to the Tleilaxu capital, Bandalong  now ruled by renegade Honored Matre leader Hellica  to pacify Hellica by having Uxtal produce (under threat of death and using axlotl technology) the orange adrenaline-enhancing drug used by the Honored Matres. Khrone implements a parallel plan to the pursuit of the Ithaca, purportedly to create other weapons for Daniel and Marty's conquest of the universe. He tasks Uxtal to create a ghola of Baron Vladimir Harkonnen from genetic material found in a damaged nullentropy tube (from the charred corpse of a Tleilaxu Master) in Bandalong. This ghola is to be used to condition the subsequently-grown ghola of Paul Atreides, called Paolo, himself created from blood found on an artifact from Caladan. Though Daniel and Marty lose interest in the project, Khrone continues; the Face Dancer has his own agenda for domination of the universe, and believes that, like the Tleilaxu, Daniel and Marty can be fooled.

The Guild Navigator Edrik comes to Tleilax seeking Uxtal's knowledge of axlotl tanks; the Navigator fears his kind's obsolescence when the new Ixian navigation technology (secretly masterminded by Khrone) becomes available. He seeks an alternate source of spice to break the Bene Gesserit monopoly, but even Uxtal believes that secret has died with the Tleilaxu Masters murdered by the Honored Matres. Eventually he is able to access the genetic material of deceased Master Waff, and through an accelerated process creates several (ultimately flawed) Waff gholas, hoping to unlock the secret of producing melange in the tanks. The entire universe is unaware that in the events of Chapterhouse Dune, Scytale had been forced to give the passengers of the Ithaca the secret, and it is in use on the no-ship as their primary source of spice. Murbella, leader of the Bene Gesserit New Sisterhood, conquers Tleilax, discovering that Matre Superior Hellica and several of her elite guard are also Face Dancer duplicates. Uxtal is devoured by hungry sligs, and the sole remaining Waff ghola escapes. He finds refuge with the Spacing Guild, offering Edrik something better than artificial melange  the genetic knowledge for the Guild to create their own, optimized sandworms, the natural origin of the spice cycle. Finally, it is revealed that the force behind the plot against humanity is in fact mankind's ancient enemy, the thinking machines; Daniel and Marty are in fact new incarnations of machine leader Omnius and his second-in-command Erasmus, introduced in the Legends of Dune prequel trilogy by Brian Herbert and Kevin J. Anderson.

In the series finale, Sandworms of Dune (2007), it is revealed that the autonomous Face Dancers are creations of the reincarnated Omnius and Erasmus but seek to overthrow their machine "masters" as well. Secretly in control of Ix and its technology production, Khrone manipulates the Spacing Guild and New Sisterhood, setting them up for disastrous failure in their final battle against the thinking machine forces of Omnius. When Khrone asserts dominance over even the machine empire, a smug Erasmus activates a fail-safe built into all enhanced Face Dancers, instantly killing Khrone and all of his minions across the universe.

Prelude to Dune
In the Prelude to Dune (1999–2001) prequel trilogy by Brian Herbert and Anderson, it is noted that the founder of the Bene Tleilax had been a Master named Xuttuh. Master Hidar Fen Ajidica heads Project Amal, an early attempt by the Bene Tleilax to create synthetic melange in order to eliminate dependence upon the planet Arrakis; intending an eventual Tleilaxu takeover of the universe, Ajidica sends "improved" Face Dancers off to unexplored systems.

Legends of Dune
The ancestors of the Bene Tleilax are featured in the Legends of Dune (2002–2004) prequel series by Brian Herbert and Anderson. They are a civilization of human merchants known as the "Tlulaxa", who specialize in slaves and replacement organs. They claim that the organs are grown artificially in organ farms; in reality, the vast majority of the organs are harvested from slaves. The Tlulaxa do have working organ farms, but they are used mainly as a front for the slave harvesting operations and provide only a small fraction of the replacement organs.

Description

Tleilaxu Master
Masters are the leaders and real minds of the Bene Tleilax. After Dune Messiah, they have the ability to regain their genetic memory with ease, allowing them to live forever, using the axlotl tanks to create gholas of themselves. In Heretics of Dune it is noted via epigraph that Tleilaxu sperm "does not carry forward in a straight genetic fashion [...] Gaps occur", and that they are "naturally immune to an Ixian Probe", an interrogation device which normally can extract information even from the dead. The Tleilaxu are described as short, dwarf-like characters with gray skin, hair and eyes, elfin features and pointy teeth. The Bene Gesserit suspect that their appearance is intended to encourage others to underestimate them.

Tleilaxu Masters control their creations by forcing them into a hypnotic state with some predefined, implanted sound (often a specific humming or whistling noise). In Dune Messiah, the Tleilaxu dwarf Bijaz controls the ghola Hayt through a specific humming intonation that renders Hayt open to implanted commands. In Heretics of Dune, the Master Waff attempts to control his perfectly mimicked Face Dancer copy of High Priest Tuek with a humming language, but fails due to the copy's complete assimilation into its new form.

Technologies
The Bene Tleilax are masters of biological science and control the secrets of a number of important technologies in the Dune universe.

Axlotl tank

An axlotl tank is essentially a brain-dead woman whose womb is used as a tank to create gholas. The Bene Tleilax's use of their women in this capacity explains why no one has ever seen a Tleilaxu female.

In Heretics of Dune, it is revealed that the Tleilaxu have developed the ability to grow the spice melange in axlotl tanks, breaking the monopoly on spice that Arrakis held for thousands of years which strongly controlled the economics and the politics of the Imperium.

In Chapterhouse Dune, the Bene Gesserit have acquired axlotl tank technology and are able to use it to make gholas for their own purposes, but not spice. They are revealed not to be tanks at all, but dramatically altered women.

The axlotl tank is similar to the reproductive "stumps" in Herbert's Hellstrom's Hive.

Chairdog
Another of the most profitable and widely used creations of the Tleilaxu, chairdogs are alive and partially sentient creatures used for seating. They possess the ability to shape themselves to fit their occupant.  Some characters dislike sitting on an animal and prefer normal chairs.

Chairdogs are also featured in Herbert's Whipping Star and The Dosadi Experiment, books unconnected to the Dune series.  These books also feature bedogs (chairdogs used for sleeping).

Face Dancer
Face Dancers are a servant caste of sterile humanoid shapeshifters, with full sentience but genetically programmed loyalty to the Tleilaxu Masters. They are able to physiologically change their appearance to impersonate other people. They are used by the Tleilaxu throughout the universe to replace people whom the Tleilaxu find useful, usually killing the originals. In this way they may infiltrate and control various groups in the universe. Face Dancers are "Jadacha hermaphrodites", able to change their gender at will. Herbert describes Face Dancers in their natural state in Heretics of Dune:

The Tleilaxu are able to control Face Dancers by forcing them into a hypnotic state with some predefined sound, often a specific humming or whistling noise. In Heretics of Dune, Master Waff tries to control his Face Dancer duplicate of Tuek: "Humming sounds like the noises of angry insects came from his mouth, a modulated thing that clearly was some kind of language." In Chapterhouse: Dune, Duncan Idaho notes that the mysterious observers Daniel and Marty resemble Face Dancers:

Daniel and Marty later indicate that they may in fact be independent Face Dancers:

Ghola

Similar to a clone, a ghola is a "manufactured" human duplicate; but while clones are grown from living cells, a ghola is grown in an axlotl tank from cells collected from a deceased subject. At the time of Dune, gholas have no access to the lives of the person from whom they were cloned, but after Dune Messiah, the Tleilaxu discover that a ghola can recover his or her genetic memory during a carefully staged moment of extreme stress. Much later in the series, it is revealed that the masters of the Tleilaxu have been using this knowledge gained in Dune Messiah as an improvised device for immortality: at their death, they are cloned; their clone recovers its memories, and the masters, in their serial incarnations, have memories stretching back thousands of years. The surviving Masters of Heretics of Dune are clearly the longest-lived characters in the saga, after Duncan Idaho who is the first ghola to recover its memories. Scytale himself, by the events of Chapterhouse Dune, would be over 5,000 years old through his serial incarnations.

Slig
One of the earliest successes of Tleilaxu genetic engineering, the slig is a hybrid livestock animal—a cross between a large slug and a Terran pig—first mentioned in Heretics of Dune and considered a delicacy: 'The sweetest meat this side of heaven.' Most people had thought that they were "tank-bred mutations", "ugly creatures who excreted slimy, foul-smelling residue, and whose multiple mouths ground incessantly on garbage", even though they enjoy devouring the flesh of these beasts (marinated slig medallions in rich Caladan wine sauces are considered a prime delicacy). Despite being the producers of sligs, the Tleilaxu themselves do not consume the animals, having designed them to facilitate what they see as the degrading decadence and spiritual bankruptcy of all cultures but their own.

Emperor: Battle for Dune
The Tleilaxu are one of the five subfactions in the 2001 computer game Emperor: Battle for Dune.

References

Dune (franchise) organizations
Dune (franchise) species and races
Fictional characters by gendered occupation
Fictional secret societies
Fictional elements introduced in 1965